Sacidava (Sagadava) was a Dacian town in Moesia Inferior, today's Dunăreni, Constanţa, Romania.

See also 
 Dacian davae
 List of ancient cities in Thrace and Dacia
 Dacia
 Roman Dacia

References

Ancient

Modern 

 

Dacian towns